Ilfracombe  is a rural town and locality in the Longreach Region, Queensland, Australia.

Ilfracombe calls itself The Hub of the West. The main industry is sheep rearing, mainly for wool.

Geography

Mount Rodney is in the north-east of the locality. It was named in 1861 by Frederick Walker after Rodney, an Aboriginal member of Walker's expedition.

The Central Western railway line passes through the locality with a number of rail stops in the locality (from west to east):

 Ilfracombe railway station, serving the town
 Dartmouth railway station, now abandoned

 Deroora railway station

History 
Sheep stations were established in the area from 1864.

The townsites of Ilfracombe and Longreach were amongst resumed portions of Wellshot Station. In 1892, Wellshot was known as the biggest sheep station in the world, not because of the area it occupied but because of the number of sheep it ran; 460,000.  40,000 two-year-old wethers were sold off from the property later the same year.

The Central Western railway line reached Ilfracombe in 1891 and the Post Office opened on 7 December 1891.

On 1 July 1892, the town was renamed from Wellshot was renamed Ilfracombe after the coastal town of Ilfracombe in North Devon, England.

Ilfracombe Provisional School opened on 3 May 1893. On 28 June 1899 it became Ilfracombe State School.

On 27 December 1902, part of the Aramac Division was excised to create a new local government area Ilfracombe Division, becoming Shire of Ilfracombe in 1903. Ilfracombe was the seat of the division/shire. On 15 March 2008, the Shire of Ilfracombe merged with the Shires of Isisford and Longreach to form the Longreach Region.

The town was much larger in the past.  It once had three hotels instead of the single hotel and two general stores as at 2012.

The most common response for religion was Anglican at 39.5%.

A 1.9-metre metal sculpture of National Rugby League player Matt Scott, who grew up in Ilfracombe, was unveiled in the town on 24 September 2021.  It was created by scrap metal artist Milynda Rogers who was commissioned by the Ilfracombe District Progress Association with the aim of inspiring the region's youth while also giving the town a focus of pride.  Approximately 200 people attended the official unveiling.

Heritage listings 

Ilfracombe has a number of heritage-listed sites, including:
 former Beaconsfield Station Sheep Wash, Beaconsfield Station
 Langenbaker House, Mitchell Street

Education 

Ilfracombe State School is a government primary (Prep-6) school for boys and girls at 20 McMaster Drive. In 2018, the school had an enrolment of 10 students with 2 teachers (1 full-time equivalent) and 5 non-teaching staff (3 full-time equivalent). It is organised into multi-age classes.

There is no secondary school in Ilfracombe. The nearest secondary schools are Longreach State High School in neighbouring Longreach to west and Barcaldine State High School in neighbouring Barcaldine to the east. As some parts of the locality of Ilfracombe are a long distance by road from these schools, other options are distance education and boarding schools.

Amenities 
Ilfracombe Post Office is at 20 Main Avenue. The Longreach Regional Council operates a public library at the post office using the Rural Libraries Queensland service. The library offers public access to Wi-Fi.

Other attractions and facilities in the town include swimming pool, a 14-hole golf course, racecourse and caravan park.

Attractions 

The Great Machinery Mile is an open-air display of a range of antique agricultural machinery from the local area spread alongside the Landsborough Highway within the town. It is part of the Ilfracombe Machinery and Heritage Museum.

Guided tours are available of the heritage-listed Langenbacker House in Mitchell Street.

Notable people
Notable people from the area include:
 Quentin Bryce, Governor of Queensland and Governor-General of Australia from September 2008,
 Matthew Scott, rugby league footballer, 
 Paul Wilson (meditation teacher), author of the international best selling The Little Book of Calm and the Calm series of books,

References

External links

 

Towns in Queensland
Longreach Region
Populated places established in 1891
1891 establishments in Australia
Localities in Queensland